NTB (Hangul: 엔티비) was a South Korean boy band formed by High Choice Entertainment in Seoul, South Korea. The group debuted on May 28, 2018 with Dramatic.

On February 28, 2021, High Choice announced that the group had disbanded following their last online fanmeeting, which was held on March 27, 2021.

Members
L.Min (엘민)
Seowoong (서웅)
G.O (지오)
Youngbo (영보)
Jaeha (재하)
Hyobin (효빈)

Discography

Extended plays

References

K-pop music groups
South Korean boy bands
South Korean dance music groups
Musical groups from Seoul
Musical groups established in 2018
2018 establishments in South Korea
South Korean pop music groups